Heinrich Tessenow (7 April 1876 – 1 November 1950) was a German architect, professor, and urban planner active in the Weimar era.

Biography

Tessenow is considered together with Hans Poelzig, Bruno Taut, Peter Behrens, Fritz Höger,  Ernst May, Erich Mendelsohn, Walter Gropius and Mies van der Rohe as one of the most important personalities of the architectural German panorama during the time of the Weimar Republic.

He was born in Rostock, Mecklenburg-Schwerin. His father was a carpenter, and he studied as an apprentice before studying architecture in a building trade school in Leipzig and at the Technical University of Munich, where he later taught.

Tessenow and fellow architects Hermann Muthesius and Richard Riemerschmid are credited with the 1908 Gartenstadt Hellerau, near Dresden, a housing project that was the first tangible result of the influence of the English garden city movement in Germany.  This particular strain of humane, functionalist urban planning would eventually lead to the extensive German housing projects of Ernst May and Bruno Taut in the 1920s, May's plans for Magnitogorsk and other Russian cities, and then widespread influence through Tessenow's student Otto Königsberger, an urban planner who worked in Asia, Latin America, Africa and particularly India, for instance the 1948 plan for the Indian city of Bhubaneswar.

During the next years, under the Weimar Republic, Tessenow became a member of the Bund Deutscher Architekten and of the Deutscher Werkbund, he received a first laurea honoris causa by the University of Rostock then a second laurea honoris causa by the Technische Hochschule of Stoccarda and finally he became a member of the Bund Deutscher Architekten.

Tessenow taught at the Institute of Technology in Berlin-Charlottenburg from 1926 until 1934 when he was fired by the nazist administration. Curiously Tessenow is also known through his student and one-time assistant, the Reichsarchitect Albert Speer who later became a cabinet minister during the Third Reich.  Tessenow taught Speer in 1925 (after Speer had been rejected from Hans Poelzig's class for bad drawing technique), who became Tessenow's assistant in 1927 at the age of 22.  Speer's memoirs describe Tessenow's personal, discursive, informal teaching style, and his preference for architecture that expressed national culture and simplified forms.  He was known for the saying, "The simplest form is not always the best, but the best is always simple."

Until the end of World War II he lived retired in his country house, spending most of his time studying the reconstruction of urban centres in the Pomerania and Mecklenburg regions.

After the war he was asked to teach at the University of Berlin by the Soviet administration, where he was named Emeritus Professor. He spent the last years of his life on some important works never finished.

His writings
 Housebuilding and Such Things (written in 1916, but translated in English in 1989)

Heinrich Tessenow Medal

Since 1962 the Alfred Toepfer Foundation of Hamburg has awarded a periodic gold medal for architectural excellence, honoring Tessenow's name. Together with the medal, each year the  Alfred Toepfer Foundation also awards the Heinrich Tessenow Stipendiat to a young architect. Past recipients include Christian Jonasse or Andrés Jaque, who have since become well known professionals.

Portrayal in the media
Heinrich Tessenow has been portrayed by the following actors in film, television and theater productions.
 Trevor Howard in the 1982 United States television production Inside the Third Reich.

References

1876 births
1950 deaths
People from Rostock
People from the Grand Duchy of Mecklenburg-Schwerin
19th-century German architects
Housing in Germany
Technical University of Munich alumni
Academic staff of the Technical University of Berlin
20th-century German architects